Geoffrey L Bell, who was born in 1939, is an economist, banker, and Executive Secretary of the Washington-based Group of Thirty, a council of private and central bankers.

Born in Grimsby, he was educated at the London School of Economics, before working at Her Majesty's Treasury, and later returning to the LSE to lecture on monetary economics in 1964.

Between 1966 and 1969, he served as economic advisor to the British Embassy in Washington, then joined the Schroders Bank, as assistant to the Chairman, Gordon Richardson, later Bank of England Governor. He was chairman of the bank Guinness Mahon Holdings between 1987 and 1993.

In 1978 he founded the G30 advisory group, after an invitation from representatives of the Rockefeller Foundation, and today remains that group's executive secretary.

In 1982 he formed his own consulting company,  Geoffrey Bell and Company, which advises central banks and governments on financial management issues.  His clients included the Central Bank of Venezuela, for which he was financial adviser for over twenty-five years.

Author
The Euro-Dollar Market and the International Financial System, MacMillan, 1973,

External links
Profile of Geoffrey Bell  at AFP Online

1939 births
Alumni of the London School of Economics
Group of Thirty
Living people
People from Grimsby
Schroders people